Canisius Golden Griffins basketball may refer to either of the basketball teams that represent Canisius College:
Canisius Golden Griffins men's basketball
Canisius Golden Griffins women's basketball